NBS Bank Limited, commonly referred to as NBS Bank, is a commercial bank in Malawi. It is licensed as a commercial bank, by the Reserve Bank of Malawi, central bank and national banking regulator.

Location
The head office and man branch of NBS Bank are located in NBS House, at the corner of Chipembere Highway and Johnstone Road, in the city of Blantyre, the financial capital of Malawi. This location is often referred to as Ginnery Corner, in the neighborhood known as Chichiri, Blantyre. The geographical coordinates of this bank's headquarters are: 15°48'02.0"S, 35°01'20.0"E (Latitude:-15.800556; Longitude:35.022222).

Overview
NBS Bank is a midsized retail bank in Malawi. , the bank's asset base was valued at MWK:123.1 billion (US$170 million), with shareholders' equity of MWK:11.5 billion (approximately US$16 million).

History
In 1964, Central Africa Building Society, Commonwealth Century Building Society and First Permanent Building Society merged  to form New Building Society (NBS). The institution converted into a commercial bank in 2004, following the issuance of a banking license by the Reserve Bank of Malawi, the national banking regulator.

Ownership
The shares of the bank are traded on the Malawi Stock Exchange, where they are listed under the symbol NBS. The shareholders in the stock of NBS Bank included the following, as of December 2018:

Branches and departments
, the bank maintains branches at the following locations. The branches are referred to as Service Centres.
 Mzuzu Service Centre: Mzuzu
 Mzimba Service Centre: Mzimba
 Nkhotakota Service Centre: Nkhotakota
 Nkhata Bay Service Centre: Nkhata Bay
 Dwangwa Service Centre: Dangwa
 Rumphi Service Centre: Rumphi
 Karonga Service Centre: Karonga
 Mchinji Service Centre: Mchinji 
 Kasungu Service Centre: Kasungu
 Lilongwe Service Centre: Lilongwe
 Capital City Service Centre: Lilongwe
 Dedza Service Centre: Dedza
 Kanengo Service Centre: Kanengo, Lilongwe
 Salima Service Centre: Salima 
 Liwonde Service Centre: Liwonde
 Blantyre Service Centre: Blantyre
 Ginnery Corner Service Centre: Chichiri, Blantyre Main Branch
 Limbe Service Centre: Limbe
 Zomba Service Centre: Zomba
 Mangochi Service Centre: Mangochi 
 Mulanje Service Centre: Mulanje
 Chichiri Mall Service Centre: Chichiri Mall, Chichiri, Blantyre
 Nchalo Service Centre: Nchalo, Blantyre
 Ntcheu Service Centre: Ntecheu
 Balaka Service Centre: Balaka.

Governance
Vizenge Kumwenda serves as the chairman of the eleven-person board of directors. The chief executive officer is Kwanele Ngwenya, who is assisted by fifteen other senior managers in the day-to-day running of the company.

Recapitalization
During 2015, NBS Bank fell below the minimum capital requirements for commercial banks in Malawi, under the Basel II financial guidelines. NBS Bank applied to the Reserve Bank of Malawi to be given time to implement a rights issue and restore compliance. That permission was granted, with a deadline of 30 June 2017. The capital call to existing shareholders was opened from 19 May 2017 and closed on 23 June 2017. A total of MWK:11.6 billion (approximately US$16.25 million) in new capital was raised. Other changes at the bank, in the same time frame, included retrenchment of some of the employees.

See also
 List of banks in Malawi
 Economy of Malawi
 Reserve Bank of Malawi
 Malawi Stock Exchange

References

External links
  Website of NBS Bank
 Website of Reserve Bank of Malawi
  Website of Malawi Stock Exchange

Banks of Malawi
Banks established in 1964
1964 establishments in Malawi
Companies listed on Malawi Stock Exchange